İsmailoğlu is a Turkish surname. Its literal meaning of "descendant of Ismail" is similar to that of the Bosnian surname Smajić and the Albanian family name Smajli and it strongly indicates Muslim religious affiliation of its bearer. People with the name include:
 Meliha İsmailoğlu (born 1993), Bosnian-Turkish female volleyball player
 Yaşar İsmailoğlu (born 1945), Turkish-Cypriot poet, writer and journalist

References

Turkish-language surnames
Patronymic surnames
Surnames from given names